Hambleton is a local government district in North Yorkshire, England.  The administrative centre is Northallerton, and the district includes the outlying towns and villages of Bedale, Thirsk, Great Ayton, Stokesley, and Easingwold.

The district was formed by the Local Government Act 1972 on 1 April 1974, as a merger of Northallerton Urban District, Bedale Rural District, Easingwold Rural District, Northallerton Rural District, and parts of Thirsk Rural District, Stokesley Rural District and Croft Rural District, all in the North Riding of Yorkshire.

Geography
Hambleton covers an area of 1,311.17 km² most of which, 1,254.90 km², is green space.  The district is named after the Hambleton Hills, part of the North York Moors National Park, on the eastern edge of the district.  This area is the subject of a national habitat protection scheme as articulated in the United Kingdom's Biodiversity Action Plan.
About 75% of the district lies in the Vales of Mowbray and of York. These two vales consist largely of low lying and intensively worked arable land which is mostly used for farming. 16% lies within the North York Moors National Park and just over 1% is in the York green belt zone.

Towns

Towns in the district are listed below. Northallerton houses the headquarters of Hambleton District Council. The district is also the location of 17 wards and 177 parishes.

Bedale
Easingwold
Northallerton
Stokesley
Thirsk

District Council

Abolition 
In July 2021 the Ministry of Housing, Communities and Local Government announced that in April 2023, the non-metropolitan county will be reorganised into a unitary authority.  Hambleton District Council will be abolished and its functions transferred to a new single authority for the non-metropolitan county of North Yorkshire.

Demographics

In 2007 Hambleton had an estimated population of 86,900 an increase of 3.2% on the population of 84,200 recorded in the 2001 UK census.  In the 2001 census 83% of respondents identified their religion as Christians above the national average for England which was 71.74%.  No other religion accounted for more than 0.2% of the population; the next two largest groups of respondents were those with no religion, at 10.40%, and those who did not state a religion, at 6.14%.

References

Further reading
Golisti K.O.M. (1998) Hambleton and its History. Ashdown Products.

External links

 Hambleton District Council

 
Districts of England established in 1974
Non-metropolitan districts of North Yorkshire